Keith Alan Huewen (born 23 August 1956 in Southend-on-Sea, Essex) is an English former professional Grand Prix motorbike road racer, and ex sports commentator with BT Sport where he primarily commentated on MotoGP. Huewen lives in Northampton and is a serving member on the board of Riders for Health a charity founded by motorcycle grand prix enthusiasts and headed by HRH Princess Anne.

Motorcycle Grand Prix results

(key) (Races in bold indicate pole position; races in italics indicate fastest lap)

References

1957 births
Living people
English motorcycle racers
English television presenters
English sports broadcasters
Sky Sports presenters and reporters
Motorsport announcers
Sportspeople from Southend-on-Sea
350cc World Championship riders
500cc World Championship riders